Air Tanzania is the flag carrier airline of Tanzania.

Destinations
As of July 2022, Air Tanzania flies to 13 local routes and 10 international passenger destinations including Guangzhou; China which was launched on 17 July 2022 as per the below summary:

References

External links
https://www.airtanzania.co.tz/index.php

Air Tanzania